Runald Beckman (born 5 July 1951) is a Swedish former athlete. He competed in the men's decathlon at the 1976 Summer Olympics. He also competed in the four-man bobsleigh at the 1980 Winter Olympics.

See also
 List of athletes who competed in both the Summer and Winter Olympic games

References

External links
 

1951 births
Living people
Athletes (track and field) at the 1976 Summer Olympics
Bobsledders at the 1980 Winter Olympics
Swedish decathletes
Swedish male bobsledders
Olympic athletes of Sweden
Olympic bobsledders of Sweden
People from Luleå
Sportspeople from Norrbotten County
20th-century Swedish people